The Royal Belfast Academical Institution is an independent grammar school in Belfast, Northern Ireland. With the support of Belfast's leading reformers and democrats, it opened its doors in 1814. Until 1849, when it was superseded by what today is Queen's University, the institution pioneered Belfast's first programme of collegiate education. Locally referred to as Inst, the modern school educates boys from ages 11 to 18. It is one of the eight Northern Irish schools represented on the Headmasters' and Headmistresses' Conference. The school occupies an 18-acre site in the centre of the city on which its first buildings were erected.

History

Dissident foundation

William Bruce wrote in 1806 in denunciation of "visionary notions" to establish an academical institution that "[t]his town has from some years been in possession of an excellent plan of school education for which it is indebted to the Belfast Academy funded in 1786". What was to become the school was not the first visionary notion of William Drennan to be opposed by Bruce, the principal of the Belfast Academy. In the 1790s, Drennan and his Society of United Irishmen had called for complete and immediate Catholic Emancipation and for a radical and democratic reform of the Irish Parliament.

For Drennan, the new institution was an expression his resolve, in the wake of the 1798 rebellion, to "be content to get the substance of reform more slowly" and with "proper preparation of manners or principles"." He was joined by leading Belfast merchants and professional men, including the former United men Robert Simms and Robert Callwell, who had been among the proprietors of the United paper, Northern Star; the Tennent brothers, William who had been a state prisoner, and Robert, who as a ship's surgeon had been a sympathetic witness to the 1797 Table Bay naval mutiny; and the botanist John Templeton. They seconded Drennan as he persuaded a town meeting in 1807  "to facilitate and render less expensive the means of acquiring education; to give access to the works of literature to the middle and lower classes of society; to make provision for the instruction of both sexes... "

The scheme was ambitious, comprising a school department for boys and a collegiate department in which both young men and women could receive lectures and instruction in the natural sciences, classics, modern languages, English literature and medicine. In 1808, it was further proposed that facilities should be provided for professors of divinity responsible to their respective denominations, so that the institution could become a seminary for the training of ministers. As might have been anticipated, the Presbyterian Church, which had no such facility in Ireland (their candidates for ordination had to train in Glasgow), alone took up the offer. Lord Castlereagh perceived "a deep laid scheme again to bring the Presbyterian Synod within the ranks of democracy".  Arthur Wellesley (the future Duke of Wellington) concurred. The entire project was "democratical"—pervaded by "the republican spirit of the Presbyterians".

William Bruce and his friends mocked the proposed system of governance, comparing it to revolutionary French constitutions that had excited debate in Belfast in 1790s. It was a "machine", they suggested, "so full of checks that it will not move". The sovereign body of the institution was as an annual general meeting of subscribers. They elected both boards of managers and visitors, but with a complicated system of rotation "to preclude the possibility of the management falling into the hands of a few individuals". The proposal for the institution, nonetheless, received sufficient establishment support to secure a charter in 1810. 

William Stuart, Anglican primate archbishop of Ireland, enrolled as a first class subscriber, and George Chichester, 2nd Marquess of Donegall, the town's landlord, leased the land to the institution and, on 3 July 1810, laid its foundation stone. The eminent English architect John Soane, who designed the new Bank of England in 1788, prepared drawings free of charge. A total of £25,000 was raised: £5,000 in India under the patronage of the Governor-General, Earl of Moira, Francis Rawdon-Hastings, the balance largely from Belfast merchants and businessmen able to nominate in return one boy to receive free education. The funds, however, sufficed to erect only one, comparatively plain brown-brick, section of Soane's intended stucco and Doric-column quadrangle. The institution was formally opened on 1 February 1814.

In his address at the opening of the grammar school on 1 February 1814, Drennan promised that "the mysterious veil that makes one knowledge for the learned and another for the vulgar... would be torn down". Admission would be "perfectly unbiased by religious distinctions", fees held "as low as possible", and, perhaps most startling for the times, that discipline would rely on "example" rather than on "manual correction of corporal punishment". This may have owed something to the example of an earlier Belfast schoolmaster whose portrait was to hang in the new institution, David Manson. As recounted by Drennan, in his Donegall Street school in 1760s Manson had banished "drudgery and fear" by teaching children on "the principle of amusement".

"Wars of independence"
When in the following year, 1815, the collegiate department enrolled its first students, it became the first university college to be established in the British Isles since Trinity College Dublin was founded at the end of the sixteenth century. It soon ran into controversy.

At a St. Patrick's Day dinner in 1816, chaired by Dr. Robert Tennent, board members did not disguise their broader political sympathies. They led one another, and staff, in a series of radical toasts: to the French and South American Revolutions, to Catholic Emancipation and a "Radical Reform of the Representation of the People in Parliament", and, perhaps most controversially, to "the exiles of Erin" under "the wing of the republican eagle" in the United States. Despite the resignation of all the board members present, the government seized upon the incident to attach conditions the annual £1,500 it had granted, reluctantly, for the college's seminary. Inst historian, James Jamieson, is convinced that "what the government really wanted was to do away with the collegiate status of Inst and so prevent the establishment of a native seminary for the Presbyterian ministry where a culture opposed to passive acceptance of the ideas of privilege and class distinction might be imbibed".

Tory critics of the institution might also have been noted that in 1815 a list of books prepared for the literary department included works by the English radicals John Horne Tooke, William Godwin, Joseph Priestley and Thomas Belsham. But, perhaps convinced that in the face of the "Catholic democracy" conjured by the great "Emancipator" Daniel O'Connell the republican spirit of Ulster Presbyterianism was sufficiently cooled, by 1831 government had not only restored the grant;  King William IV bestowed upon the Institution the title "Royal".

Yet further controversy followed. Conservative Presbyterian clergy, led by Henry Cooke, believed the teaching staff combined theological laxity—their refusal to subscribe to Westminster Confession of Faith with its reference to the Pope as the "Antichrist", and affirmation of the Holy Trinity—with political error. Staff did not hide their support for the disestablishment of the Church of Ireland (privileged in relation to Presbyterians but, in Cooke's view, a bulwark of the Protestant interest in Ireland).

Cooke did not succeed in removing either of the principal objects of his ire: those he accused of anti-trinitarian "Arian" or "Socinian" heresy, Henry Montgomery, head of the English department, and the junior William Bruce (who had departed from his father's orthodoxy), Professor of Latin and Greek. The Board refused an inquisition into their religious orthodoxy. But while Inst may have won what Jamieson called its "wars of independence", the dispute contributed to the establishment in 1853 of Assembly College, a seminary under the direct control of the Presbyterian Synod, and to the government passing over the institution in establishing a Queens College (the later Queens University). Inst had upheld its principles but at the cost of its collegiate status and the associated government grant.

On 1 November 1855, Lord Lieutenant of Ireland, the Earl of Carlisle, unveiled a statue in front of the institution on College Square East of the popular Frederick Richard, Earl of Belfast, son of the Marquis of Donegall, patron of, among other causes in Belfast, the Working Class Association for the Promotion of General Improvement. After Henry Cooke died in 1868, significance was attached to his bronze likeness displacing that of the young liberal aristocrat, and that it should stand with its back to the institution Cooke distrusted.

Owing to the initiative of Dr. James MacDonnell ("the unchallenged doyen of Belfast medicine"). from 1835, the Collegiate Department had provided Ulster with its first medical school in Ulster. It had its own teaching hospital, the Royal Institution Hospital in Barrack Street, sometimes known as the College Hospital. In 1847 the school and college building themselves served as a fever hospital. In Belfast, typhus, a deadly companion of the hunger driving country people into the town, struck one in every five residents.

Inst continued to provide college education until Queens College Belfast opened in October 1849. When it was found that the new college had made no provision for anatomical and dissecting rooms, Inst continued to provide the necessary accommodation in its old medical department until 1862.

The Collegiate Department was to leave the town an important enlightenment legacy in the Belfast Natural History and Philosophical Society. Formed by staff and scholars in 1821, the society is the origin of both the Botanical Gardens and what is now the Ulster Museum.

First generations 
Among the early graduates of the Institution was William Tennent's nephew, Robert Tennent, who in 1820s was a member of John Stuart Mill's London Debating Society. Together with his friend James Emerson (Belfast Academy), he joined Byron in the Greek War of Independence. On return to Belfast they stood against one another in the 1832 election, Tennent the Whig losing to Emerson, the Tory, a result that marked the ebb-tide of political liberalism in Belfast.

In mid century, General Certificates from the Collegiate Department were common to several Presbyterian ministers who, in the wake of the Great Famine, became passionately involved in the tenants rights movement. Cooke denounced them for undermining, not only property, but also the Union by sharing platforms with Catholics intent on restoring a parliament in Dublin. His worst fears were realised in David Bell who, forced to resign his ministry and despairing of constitutional methods, was sworn into Irish Republican Brotherhood by Jeremiah O'Donovan Rossa.

Several campaigning newspaper editors were also students of the Institution: James Simms, editor of the Northern Whig; James MacNeight, editor of the Londonderry Standard and of the Belfast-based Banner of Ulster; and Charles Gavan Duffy, of the Young Ireland paper, The Nation. Duffy, a Roman Catholic from Monaghan, enrolled in the collegiate school of logic, rhetoric and belles-lettres in the early 1840s.

Duffy was also to contribute to the Belfast-based Northern Herald, edited between 1834 and 1835 by the "Old Instonian" Thomas O'Hagan. O'Hagan would go on to become the first Catholic Lord Chancellor of Ireland (1868–1874 and 1880–1881).

The limits of non-denominationalism
Drennan was adamant that the admission of scholars should be "perfectly unbiased by religious distinctions". Yet when O'Hagan was at Inst in the 1820s, the Oxford Dictionary of National Biography records him as being the school's only Catholic pupil.

In the 1830s Henry Cooke and other leading Protestant evangelicals had been instrumental in defeating the prospects for integrated education. When the Dublin Castle administration sought to provide Ireland, "in advance of anything available at that time in England", a system of grant-aided non-denominational education. Cooke, at once scented danger in the freedom that would have been granted priests to enter schools and instruct their "own" students in religion. The concept of educating Catholics and Protestants together was dealt a further blow when in the 1840s the Catholic bishops objected to the "Godless" Queen's Colleges, loudly seconded—despite the pleas of Duffy's fellow Young Irelander, Thomas Davis that "the reasons for separate education are reasons for separate life"—by Daniel O'Connell.

When in 1849 a Queen's College (now Queen's University) opened in Belfast, the Collegiate Department closed. Inst continued as a school for boys, with both day and boarding pupils. There was no standard course as such. Boys’ parents paid only for the subjects their sons took. Mathematics, English and writing were the most popular subjects, classics and French less so.

The three hundred boys attending were largely, but not exclusively, Presbyterian in what remained a largely Presbyterian town. Those taking the Anglican communion (in the established Church of Ireland), had, from the seventeenth century, attended The Royal School, Armagh and Portora Royal School, and in Belfast favoured the older Belfast—now also "Royal"—Academy. From 1774 the Quakers had had Friends' School, Lisburn; and from 1865 Wesleyans attended Methodist College Belfast. Co-educational "Methody" was to emerge in the 20th century as Inst's closest rival and competitor. The dramatist and novelist F. Frankfort Moore, attending Inst in the 1860s, recalls "not half a dozen Roman Catholic boys". St Malachy's Catholic diocesan college had opened its doors in 1833.

Industry and empire
A study sample of 96 members of the Belfast's mid-nineteenth-century civic elite—leading figures in trade, industry and the professions—found a plurality, a third, had attended Inst. The school clearly held "a proud place in Belfast society".

In industrial Belfast, the path to civic prominence did necessarily lead through further education. In the 1860s two boys left the school, age 15, to begin apprenticeships in Belfast's engineering giant, Harland and Wolff. William Pirrie rose to become the shipbuilder's chairman, and Alexander Carlisle the yard manager. In 1889, they were joined by another Instonian, Thomas Andrews, who became head of the draughting department. All the were involved in the design and construction of what in their day were the largest ships afloat, the Oceanic II in 1899, and Olympic in 1911 and its sister ship the Titanic, with which Andrews went down on its lll-fated maiden voyage in 1912.

Beginning in the 1840s, the Indian Civil Service examination (administered in its last years by the Collegiate Department) opened the imperial service to Irish school graduates, both Catholic and Protestant. Service in India and in the broader British Empire was a common career path for Instonians over the coming century. Having applied to the Indian Civil Service at the end of this era in 1940, Noel Larmour (1934) had the task, and beginning with Burma, of helping wind up the Empire in several of its territories.

Over 700 old boys of the school served in the various theatres of the World War I. 132 of them died.

The modern school
Until the end of the nineteenth century, Inst did not have a principal or a headmaster. The academic and administrative direction of the school had remained in the hands of a group of senior teachers (the headmasters) who sat on the board of masters. The first principal, Robert Dods, headmaster of modern languages, was appointed in 1898. Since then Inst has had eight principals, R. M. Jones (1898–1925), G. Garrod (1925–1939), J. C. A. Brierley (1939–1940), J. H. Grummitt (1940–1959), S. V. Peskett (1959–1978), T. J. Garrett (1978–1990), R. M. Ridley (1990–2006). The current principal, J. A. Williamson was appointed in January 2007 and is the first female to hold the post.

At the end of the nineteenth century, improving transport services into Belfast and, more importantly, the need to provide additional classroom space to accommodate the greatly increasing numbers of pupils seeking enrolment persuaded the governors to end boarding. Since 1902 the school has been for day pupils only.

Between 1864 and 1898 Inst had a small preparatory school on the main site in College Square, situated in the North Wing. In 1917, the board of governors opened a new preparatory school, with a small boarding department, Inchmarlo, in south Belfast, in Marlborough Park North. In 1935, Inchmarlo transferred from Marlborough Park to its present site at Mount Randal in Cranmore Park. The preparatory school is an integral part of The Royal Belfast Academical Institution.

In the 1920s, in the period of Geoffrey Garrod's principalship, the house system was founded, and a school uniform, including the ubiquitous yellow and black quartered cap, was worn for the first time.

In the Second World War, 106 Old Instonians fell in the conflict. During the war, younger pupils attended branch schools at The Royal School, Dungannon, and at the house known as Fairy Hill in Osborne Gardens. Air-raid shelters were built on the rear quad and a barrage balloon was anchored to the middle of the front lawn.

The serious civil disorder affecting Belfast in the 1970s and 1980s was a considerable challenge to Inst as a city centre school. The Europa, close to the school, was reputedly "the most bombed hotel in the world", having been hit 36 times. Inst had regular bomb alerts, causing the entire school to evacuate and assemble on the front lawn, but in the course of the Troubles not one day of school was lost.

Since the 1980s, Inst has benefited from a number of major infrastructure investments: the Jack McDowell Pavilion at Osborne Park, the purpose-built sixth form centre, a multi-function sports centre and fitness suite, the Christ Church Centre of Excellence, the new pavilion at Bladon Park, a water-based synthetic hockey pitch at Shaw's Bridge and the Centre of Innovation in the technology department.

Inst currently has over one thousand pupils on the main site and over two hundred pupils in the preparatory department, Inchmarlo. About 150 new pupils enter every year.

Curriculum
For the first three years, boys normally follow a common curriculum: in the fourth year the curriculum is still general but certain options are introduced, and at the end of the fifth, boys sit the examination for the Northern Ireland GCSE. Subjects studied at AS/A2 level in the sixth form include English, modern history, geography, economics, French, German, Spanish, Greek, Latin, physical education, business studies, technology, mathematics, further mathematics, physics, politics, chemistry, biology, music and art.

Houses

Sports and societies

There are numerous clubs and societies, a school orchestra, choir and band, a contingent of the Combined Cadet Force, Scouts and Explorer Scouts (74th) and a community service group.

Sport
The school offers a wide selection of sports, with rugby union being the most dominant. Inst have won the Ulster Schools Cup outright 32 times along with four shared titles, winning the cup most recently in 2017 against Methodist College Belfast. Rugby and hockey are played in the winter; athletics, cricket (played at Osborne Park) and lawn tennis occupy the summer months; badminton, fencing, rowing, squash and swimming (including water polo and life-saving) take place throughout the year. Teams representing the school take part not only in matches and activities within the province, but also in events open to all schools in the United Kingdom.

The 1st XI consistently feature in the finals of all three competitions they enter (The Irish Schools Tournament, The McCullough Cup and the Burney Cup). In 2016 four Instonians played Olympic hockey, three for Ireland and one for Great Britain. In recent times other school sports have also been more frequently making headlines. Inst is one of only four schools in Northern Ireland to participate in competitive rowing. In 2005 the first ever Inst crew travelled to the Henley Royal Regatta in England. It regularly participates in various regattas throughout Ireland and abroad.

In 1952 the school sent a team to the British Schools Athletic Championship at the White City, London. German schools also participated. Inst won the 4 x 110 yards relay.

In swimming the school teams regularly go to competitions within Ireland and abroad. In 2005, 3 of the team qualified for the Irish International Schools Squad. In the same year the senior team came 3rd in the Bath Cup competition held in London. Recently the team picked up a number of medals in the Irish Schools, held in the NAC in Dublin on the 4 February 2006. Again one swimmer qualified for the International Schools Squad, while the senior relay team became Irish champions in both the medley and freestyle relays, breaking both Irish Schools records in the process. On 12 May 2006 the senior team again won the Bath Cup competition, in a new record time. In February 2007, the team again performed well in the Irish Schools, gaining numerous medals and retaining both senior relay titles. The team narrowly missed out on the 2007 Bath Cup title, being beaten by 0.4 seconds in a thrilling race which was down to the wire. However, the team did shave a huge 3 seconds off the record that they themselves had set the year before, and also took the Otter title and record for the 4x50 medley relay.

In March 2008, they won the Bath Cup again, in a new record time. They also broke the Otter Medley title, with two members winning both titles for a second time. Water polo teams have competed in various events and tours, the most recent to the Netherlands in 2006. In January 2007 the team came runners-up in the Irish Schools Water Polo Championships. Numerous players have gone on to gain representative and international honours. Football is played at Inst with 3 senior teams regularly competing in league and cup competitions, although it is not played below fifth form. The school hosts a number of students who represent their country in various sports. Also since 2010 the swimming team has won the Bath Cup three times, the Otter Medley Cup twice and the Otter Challenge Cup four times, the most recent being winning all three trophies in 2017.

Music
Musical groups include the choir, which won the UTV Choir of the Year competition in 1999, the orchestra, the jazz band led by past pupil David Howell, and the string group.

Among public performances and television recordings, the music department have two major concerts a year in November and March, along with the annual Carol Service. In 2010, the Easter concert took place on 29 April in the Waterfront Hall in Belfast, to mark the 200th anniversary of the school. In the bicentenary year, Philip Bolton chose to compose a new arrangement of the school song which was much more instrumental.

Scouting
The school sponsors 74th Belfast (RBAI) Scout Group which opened on 12 February 1926. The first Group Scoutmaster was William (Billy) Greer who led the group for 38 years. One of the first patrol leaders, Wilfred M Brennan, became Chief Commissioner for Northern Ireland. In 1929, the group was so large it contained three troops.

War time saw a former assistant scoutmaster, John Haire, killed when his Hurricane fighter was shot down on May 6, 1940. His family donated an annual prize for scouting activity. By 1945, 205 out of 430 former members had served in the armed forces or in the merchant navy. A memorial cairn was built on Bessy Bell near Baronscourt in County Tyrone to commemorate the 18 old boys who were killed in the warr. There is a memorial plaque in Baronscourt Parish Church.

In 1940, JH Grummit became school principal and later became the group's first county commissioner. In 1947, three Sea Scout Patrols were formed. The Duke of Edinburgh's Award Scheme was started in the early 1960s.

Ronnie Hiscocks led the group from 1965 to 1992. September 1970 saw the formation of the new venture unit for boys aged 16 and older. In 1987, the 100th Gold Duke of Edinburgh's Award was presented to a member of 74th with many of these scouts going on to claim the Queen's Scout Award. The sea and land sections combined in 1971. That same year saw the group travelled to the continent for the first time, to Kandersteg in Switzerland.

In 1992, Martin Keane took over the group and the boys got to experience Martin's love for mountaineering at home and abroad. 1995 saw a long record of consecutive summer camps come to an end.

In 1997, David Scott became the group's fourth leader. 2005 saw the group travel outside Europe for the first time, to Canada. In 2008, the group partnered with Habitat for Humanity NI to go to Argentina to build homes for the poor. Trips to Mozambique, Cambodia and Ethiopia followed. In 2011, a number of scouts met Prince Edward and Scott became Belfast County Commissioner. In 2012, a contingent of Scouts attended President Obama's visit to Belfast's Waterfront Hall. 2015 saw the group become a registered charity. 2016 saw a number of 90th anniversary celebrations.

The group continued to maintain high participation with 85 young people in the scout troop (ages 10.5 to 14), the explorer unit (14 to 18) and the scout network (18 to 25) in 2017.

Debating
The school's debating society, more properly known as the Royal Academical Debating Society, is the oldest continuously extant body of its kind in Ireland and is currently overseen by Lynn Gordon and Chris Leathley. The society meets regularly at both junior and senior level and aims to develop initiative, confidence, and an appreciation of the culture of both debate and civilised argument. Two internal competitions are run within Inst. There is an inter-souse debating competition (current champions are Larmor), and the Gawin Orr Public Speaking Competition which are both held annually. The society also holds an annual dinner at which members celebrate past successes and wish leaving members well. 

The inaugural RBAI Invitational Debating Tournament was held in 2007 and has continued on an annual basis since then. Inst have won this tournament on three occasions (2007, 2009 & 2010) whilst St Malachy's were the victors in 2008. In 2008, an Inst team won the first Debating Matters Competition to be held in Northern Ireland and the following year, Michael Frazer won Best Individual Speaker. School debating teams have recently been some of the most successful in the province, reaching the final of the Northern Ireland Schools Debating Championship on five occasions (1998, 2007, 2010, 2011 and 2014), and have won the competition twice, defeating Thornhill College, Derry in 2007 and Bangor Grammar School in 2011 in the final at Parliament Buildings, Stormont.

Royal Belfast Academical Institution has successfully competed in many European debating competitions. In 2009, the Inst team won the NI European Youth Parliament Competition and went on to represent Northern Ireland in the UK finals held in Durham. In March 2010, Inst also participated in the All-Ireland European Council Debates held annually at Dublin Castle. Representing Germany, the RBAI team were awarded 2nd place out of the 28 teams from across Ireland who competed, with RBAI also winning the TE Utley Memorial Award with an essay on the future of Britain in geopolitics. Inst also regularly participate in the European Council Debates held in Stormont.

Inchmarlo
Royal Belfast Academical Institution has a preparatory department called Inchmarlo, founded in 1907 and now set in a  site on Cranmore Park, off the Malone Road in South Belfast. Inchmarlo House was the former home of Sir William Crawford, a director of the York Street Flax Spinning Mill. It employs 11 full-time staff and caters for boys aged between 4 and 11 whose standard uniform consists of traditional school-caps, shorts, knee-high socks, school-blazers and leather satchels. It constantly attains impressive results in the 'Eleven-plus' examination with 75% of pupils gaining an 'A' grade. Of those, approximately 99% (around 40) transfer to the main school every year. The headmistress of Inchmarlo Preparatory School is Andrea Morwood.

Alumni

References

Reference bibliography 

 
 

Further reading

External links
 Royal Belfast Academical Institution
 Instonians

Educational institutions established in 1810
Grammar schools in Belfast
Member schools of the Headmasters' and Headmistresses' Conference
Boys' schools in Northern Ireland
Grade A listed buildings
1810 establishments in Ireland
Preparatory schools in Northern Ireland
Protestant schools in Northern Ireland